Eraserheads (sometimes stylized as ERASƎRHEADS or ƎRASƎRHƎADS) are a Filipino alternative rock band formed in 1989. With a line-up comprising Ely Buendia, Buddy Zabala, Marcus Adoro, and Raimund Marasigan, the band became one of the most influential and successful in the history of Filipino music. Often dubbed as "The Beatles of the Philippines", they are credited for spearheading a second wave of Manila band invasions, paving the way for a host of Filipino alternative rock bands like Rivermaya. 

The band released several singles, albums, and EPs. They achieved commercial success with their third album Cutterpillow (1995), which achieved platinum status several times. They also received the Viewer's Choice Award at the 1997 MTV Video Music Awards in New York, the only Filipino artist to have received the award before the conception of the MTV Asia Awards.

History

1989–1992: Formation and early years 

In 1989, two college bands from the University of the Philippines Diliman were both in search of new members for a new group. Curfew, which consisted of Buddy Zabala on bass, Raimund Marasigan on drums, and Marcus Adoro on guitars met up with Sunday School, which consisted of Ely Buendia on vocals and Raimund Marasigan as session drummer in December of the same year. Ely's first two college bands, Bluidie Tryste and Sunday School, were too unstable, so he posted an audition notice on a university message board. Only Raimund, Buddy, and Marcus showed up at the audition. According to an interview with myx, Raimund said that he first auditioned as a bassist, while Buddy auditioned as the drummer. After deciding that they weren't fit for their respective instruments, they switched.

The four formed a new group and called themselves Eraserheads, taking inspiration from the film Eraserhead by surrealist director David Lynch. They played mostly covers, doing gigs in schools, and playing at Manila's rock club circuit, achieving little success.

The band found that they were not good at playing covers, so they concentrated on writing their own material. Their new, original songs, played live, soon earned them a cult following in the university, which gradually spread outside the campus. One of the songs, a pop song entitled, "Pare Ko", became popular, partly because of lyrics that included a few obscenities.

The band recorded a nine-song demo tape in the garage of Marasigan's provincial home (in Candelaria, Quezon) on January 26, 1991. They then shopped the demo cassette around record labels, clubs, and radio stations, hoping to have their songs reach the public. However, they were rejected at every turn, with one recording label deeming that their demo was "not pop enough". In May 1991, a professor-friend teaching Humanities, Robin Rivera, helped them re-record and mix better versions of the demo songs on a four-track DAT recorder. The new demo was named Pop-U!, titled as an irreverent response to those who turned them down.

Meanwhile, Buendia became employed as a student copywriter by BMG Records (Pilipinas) Inc. (now part of Sony BMG Music Entertainment). He worked with BMG during the day and wrote songs with the band during the night. Eventually, the songs of Buendia and the band caught the attention of BMG A&R director Vic Valenciano. Valenciano listened to the songs and then commented that they were very raw technically, but that there was something promising in them. Subsequently, BMG gave Eraserheads' songs a try. In 1992, BMG signed up the band for a three-year record deal.

1993–1997: Mainstream success 
In July 1993, Eraserheads started recording their debut album called Ultraelectromagneticpop!. The album featured "Pare Ko" (My Friend), "Toyang" and "Tindahan ni Aling Nena" (The Store of Aling Nena), all of which were also present in Pop-U!. The album also featured a sanitized version of "Pare Ko" called "Walang Hiyang Pare Ko". Later in the same year, BMG initially released 5,000 copies of the album. The album became a smash hit, with the songs "Ligaya", "Pare Ko" and "Toyang" topping the charts that, by the end of the year, BMG sold 300,000 copies, and Ultraelectromagneticpop! turned sextuple platinum.

The album met some opposition as the Philippine Association of the Record Industry (PARI) attempted to censor "Pare Ko" but without success. The public was said to have found its OPM Fab Four in Eraserheads, opening the second wave of band invasion, dubbed "Eraserheadsmania".

In October 1994, Eraserheads released a follow-up album entitled Circus. The band said that the album aptly described their life since their debut. The album was unpredictable and unconventional compared to the OPM ballads at that time, and established the band members as songwriters and musicians. The songs varied in style and mood, ranging from euphoric and hilarious to tender and somber. In the same year, Eraserheads played during the Miss Universe Pageant which was held in Manila. On November 24, the band held their first major concert, titled "Eraserheads Jamboree," at the Folk Arts Theater (now the Tanghalang Francisco Balagtas) in Malate, Manila.

Four of the songs became successive hits: "Kailan" (When), "Magasin" (Magazine), "Alapaap" (High Clouds) and "With a Smile". Circus turned gold in just 30 days with 20,000 copies sold. Eventually, it turned quintuple platinum with 200,000 copies sold. But like ultraelectromagneticpop!, it too had its share of controversy. In August 1995, Senator Tito Sotto, who was involved in an anti-drug campaign at that time, called for a ban on the airplay and sales of "Alapaap" over an alleged promotion of drug abuse in the lyrics of the song. In response, Eraserheads denied the allegation, saying that it was just a misinterpretation, and that the song was the band's "ode to freedom", not an "ode to drug abuse".

The group's third studio album Cutterpillow, was launched an open-air concert attended by fans and followers. With Christmas barely a month over, Eraserheads opened 1996 by making history in the Philippine music scene once more. Cutterpillow turned gold, even before it hit the record stores, as a result of the pre-selling promo campaign. Soon, the band shot the music video for the song "Ang Huling El Bimbo" (The Last El Bimbo) from the album.

Later that year, the band came up with a conceptual Christmas album Fruitcake. The album is notable in that it is the first and only album of the band recorded entirely in English. This was shortly followed by a release of a companion storybook of the same title.

Also in 1995 the band was given a shot at acting when they co-starred with comedian Joey De Leon of "Eat Bulaga" in the comedy film Run Barbi Run produced by GMA Network's Cinemax Studios (now GMA Films).

1997–2002: Later years and break-up

Going International 

The year 1998 was marked with a series of gigs outside of the Philippines. Eraserheads' first-ever overseas gig was at BMG Records' "Sentosa Pop Festival" in Singapore in March 1997. It was then followed by a mini U.S. tour in May. They played at the Palace in Hollywood on May 2, 1997. Then, four months later in September, they were at the Radio City Music Hall in New York to receive the coveted "Moon Man" trophy for winning the 1997 MTV Asia Viewer's Choice Award, which made Eraserheads the first-ever Filipino artists to win the award.

The promotional CD versions of "Milk and Money", "Hard to Believe" and "Andalusian Dog", was recorded in Manila and mixed at the Electric Lady Studios, New York City in September 1997. Electric Lady Studios was built by the rock legend Jimi Hendrix. The tracks soon became a part of their fifth album, Sticker Happy, released a few days after the MTV Awards. A month later, they were back in Singapore for a series of shows and appearances for MTV Asia.

In February 1998, they represented the Philippines at the annual "Asia Live Dream '98" for NHK Broadcasting in Tokyo, Japan. Then in May, they embarked on another U.S. tour, taking them from Oakland to Los Angeles and to New York. The band toured the U.S. under the Happy Box production outfit, which was formed by brothers Haro De Guzman and Levan "Schizo" De Guzman and some other friends.

August 1998 saw the release of the album Aloha Milkyway in the Asian region, and finally in the Philippines two months later. The album contains chart-topping songs that have been re-mastered, as well as five new songs.

In early 1999, they had sold-out shows in Hong Kong, Sydney, and Dubai. Their next album, Natin99, was released in May.

Between May and June 2000, they did another tour of America dubbed, "The Pop Machine Tour – USA2000", playing in locations from New York to Chicago and to California. During their tours, they also had Noel Garcia of The Pin-Ups as an addition to their expanded line-up, who played guitars, keyboards and sometimes drums. After almost two years, the much-awaited studio album, Carbon Stereoxide, was released in March 2001, featuring the tracks, "Maskara", "Playground", "Hula" and "Palamig".

Break-up 
After weeks of speculation, it was confirmed that the main songwriter and lead singer, Ely Buendia, had left the band in mid-March 2002 for "reasons unknown". However, in subsequent interviews, Buendia pointed to business matters as the cause of the band's break-up. In 2021 however, Buendia later revealed that lack of friendship with the three other members was the reason for the band's demise.

In PULP Magazine, Buendia's wife and manager, Diane Ventura, claimed that the breakup started with a miscommunication between Buendia and the band's roadie, the result being that Buendia and Ventura turned up late at a mall gig. This upset the roadie who snidely referred to the couple as "unprofessional". Buendia's band colleagues and crew at the gig gave Buendia "a cold shoulder", related Ventura, being under the impression that Buendia had come late deliberately. The next day, Buendia brought the incident to the attention of the band's management boss, Butch Dans, to which he allegedly reverted the blame to the roadie's "unprofessionalism". Dans, however, allegedly chose to consider the roadie's account over Buendia's without much deliberation. Dans allegedly quipped that Buendia and Ventura were "probably too high on drugs" to remember the gig's schedule. Ventura stepped in to dispute the allegation and vehemently denied that she and Buendia were even told of the schedule. The other three Eraserheads also believed the roadie's story, which disturbed Buendia because he felt betrayed by their longstanding friendship. Buendia later announced to his mates through SMS that he was quitting the group.

In another interview, Marasigan said he was eating in SM Megamall, a local shopping mall when he heard of the news. He said he was "semi-surprised" and wondered if Zabala already knew about it. Adoro told of the story now famous among Eraserheads fans about Buendia's cryptic text message. He said Buendia stated in the text message that he had already "graduated." Adoro quipped in the same interview that it was natural for Buendia to graduate first, since he was in batch '87 of their college (UP Diliman), while the rest were in batch '88.

Zabala confessed in an interview that disbanding had not been that far away from the members' minds. He said that there were many occasions when they could have disbanded but did not.

Adoro expressed the belief of some people that the band was getting too old, and that it was "selfish" for the band to continue, likely referring to comments about how it's time for other bands, besides Eraserheads, to shine. The band made it clear, though, that Buendia's departure from the band wasn't in any way violent and that there was no shouting (sigawan) or any confrontation involved.

The three remaining Eraserheads decided to continue. Within a few weeks, the "new" Eheads debuted at Hard Rock Cafe in Makati on April 19, featuring a female singer-guitarist, Kris Gorra-Dancel, from the band, Fatal Posporos. However, after a few months, Adoro had quit the band as well. The remaining members of the Eheads added Diego Mapa and Ebe Dancel to their lineup and renamed their band, "Cambio".

2003–2007: Post-breakup

Tribute albums 
Just a few years after the breakup, the tribute album Ultraelectromagneticjam!: The Music of the Eraserheads was released in honor of the band.

Many questioned whether the time was right for a tribute to a group that had just disbanded four years earlier and its former members still active in the music industry. Buendia had mixed feelings about the tribute album, saying that "It’s too early to be taking part in it and I don’t see myself being part of it kasi (because) I’m still doing something here...To be part of it is like acknowledging na tapos na ako (that I am finished); isa na lang akong trophy na itatago na (I'm just a trophy to be shelved). Siguro kung uugud-ugud na ako (Maybe when I'm really old), that’s the time I’m gonna look back." Ironically though, he does guest vocals in one of the tracks, "Superproxy 2k6" by the late Master Rapper Francis M.

On May 9, 2012, Star Records and Star Cinema released The Reunion: An Eraserheads Tribute Album, a tribute album of their own that accompanies the film The Reunion.

Mini-reunions 
On February 28, 2007, the official launch of the book Tikman ang Langit: An Anthology on the Eraserheads (2007) was held at the second level of Powerbooks bookstore in Greenbelt 3, Makati. The launch was accompanied by acoustic performances by Cambio (whose members include Raimund Marasigan, Buddy Zabala and Kris Gorra-Dancel), Markus Highway (Marcus Adoro's band), and Lei Bautista of Prettier Than Pink. The performers covered Eraserheads songs such as "Ligaya" (performed by Lei Bautista), "With a Smile" (also performed by Bautista) and "Magasin" (performed by Cambio with Marcus Adoro). The event was dubbed a mini-reunion of Eraserheads, with Marasigan, Zabala and Adoro performing together for the first time in four years. Buendia did not attend because of a scheduled meeting with his surgeon and the manufacturers of the stents in his heart.

Tikman ang Langit is a collection of essays about Eraserheads written by fourteen journalists who are mostly fans of the band. The book itself was compiled by Melvin Calimag and Jing Garcia, with a foreword by Eraserheads producer Robin Rivera.

Another mini-reunion happened in Saguijo on July 26, 2007. Visitors were startled as the venue's schedule listed "Eraserheads" as a performer along with Rivermaya and Teeth. Jugs Jugueta of Itchyworms and Kris Gorra-Dancel of Cambio played guitars, Zabala on bass, Marasigan on drums, Jett Pangan of The Dawn on vocals, and producer Robin Rivera played drums when Marasigan sang. They called themselves "Eraser X" during that night. Buendia and Adoro knew about the event but did not go there as they had other gigs as well. Pupil was in Hard Rock Cafe Makati, while Adoro had gigs with Markus Highway, although Pupil's bassist Dok Sergio was able to follow and played for Teeth.

Adoro, Zabala, and Marasigan did an impromptu number at the Millennia Club called "Marooned", a production of UP bands from past and present. The song Batch 88 from "Belma en Luis", was one of the songs that were jammed by the trio.

2008–present: Reunion 
In July 2008, it was confirmed by the members that they will be reuniting for a one-off concert to be held on August 30, 2008. Ely Buendia did affirm that the reunion will be for a night's performance only, to be sponsored by a multinational tobacco company. Buendia was quoted saying "I'm not doing this for the money but for the E-heads fans who remain loyal". The sponsors are expecting 35,000 attendees with free tickets distributed to online registrants in early August 2008. This highly awaited one-night concert was initially reported to be planned for staging at the Cultural Center of the Philippines open grounds, or alternatively, the Fort Bonifacio open grounds.

On August 22, word had broken out that Philip Morris had pulled out of the concert and that the show had been "canceled".

Anti-Tobacco forces, led by Dr. Maricar Limpin, had been active in a campaign to get Eraserheads to renounce the concert and the involvement of the tobacco giant, as Alicia Keys had done in her recent concert in Indonesia. Eraserheads never issued such an announcement. However, it was believed that the pressure exerted by the anti-tobacco forces had caused Philip Morris to end their participation in the concert.

On the evening of August 24, Raimund Marasigan issued a response to this news. Posting on the Sandwich and Cambio mailing lists, Marasigan confirmed that while Philip Morris has pulled out of the production, the concert is "most definitely" pushing through on the original date, August 30, 2008, at the Fort Bonifacio open field.

Philip Morris would no longer be involved, but the entire production had been turned over to a new producer. It was later revealed that Radiohead Media Solutions, Inc., MTV Philippines, Fox International Channels Philippines, Smart Communications, Musiko Records, Greater East Asia Music & Sony BMG Music Entertainment (also known as Sony Music Philippines Inc. & BMG Rights Management) have taken over the event.

Eraserheads went onstage for their reunion concert on August 30, 2008, at The Fort Open Field, Taguig. The concert, however, was cut short halfway through a planned 30-song setlist as Buendia was rushed to the Makati Medical Hospital after experiencing chest pains. He was reported to be in stable condition. Buddy Zabala had checked on Buendia in his tent right after they went to their planned 20-minute break and saw that he already was on an oxygen mask with paramedics checking his blood pressure. As he left and came back, paramedics were already taking Buendia on an ambulance. Bandmates Zabala, Marasigan and Adoro further said that they had no idea that Buendia was already having difficulty performing. In the spirit of the reunion, Marasigan, Zabala, and Adoro went to Saguijo after the concert and they continued their sets there. Kris Gorra-Dancel, Ebe Dancel, Aia De Leon, and many other OPM artists joined them as well. During the concert, Jazz Nicolas of the Itchyworms and a close friend of the band, also joined the band and played synths, keyboards, and other instruments.

MTV Philippines President Francis Lumen stated: "He had a slight attack because of stress due to the recent passing of his mother (Lisette Buendia), and their sound check which lasted till 3 a.m. today (Saturday)." Buendia's mother died of cardiac arrest on August 28 after recovering from surgery to treat her intestinal cancer. Buendia was transferred to Philippine Heart Center 10:00 p.m. of August 31 after being treated at the critical care area of the Makati Medical Center emergency room. Sony BMG reported Buendia was "stable" after suffering hypokalemia a medical condition in which the concentration of potassium in the blood is low. Buendia had been administered with a potassium intravenous fluid.

Buendia, 37, on September 1, 2008, underwent his third heart angioplasty surgery since his January 2007 heart attack. The blood vessel operated upon was "100 percent fully restored," and Buendia was recovering in "stable condition but still under observation." On September 5, 2008, Buendia was discharged from the hospital.

On October 25 episode of Startalk, Buendia said that the reunion concert was supposed to be a "one night only" Eraserheads reunion concert. He also said that there are no talks yet for a continuation of the said concert. However, he stated that he indeed felt "bitin" (literally translated, "not satisfied") with the uncompleted concert and is open to any sequels if it would have the proper production and venue. The other three members of the band, Adoro, Zabala, and Marasigan also expressed similar views in a follow-up interview by Myx and Inquirer.

Sony-BMG Philippines, Musiko Records & Greater East Asia Music released the concert movie of the band's reunion concert on November 26, 2008.

On the January 10 edition of Supreme, a feature of The Philippine Star, it was announced that the continuation of their previous reunion concert would happen on March 7, 2009.

On January 11, this was confirmed by Marasigan through a message he posted on the Pedicab, Cambio, and Sandwich Mailing Lists.

On February 27, the band was awarded as "Myx Magna Award 2009" in the recent 4th Myx Music Awards 2009, achieving their alternative music excellence.

The band went on stage for their second reunion concert dubbed as The Final Set on March 7, 2009, at the SM Mall of Asia Concert Grounds, Pasay were approximately 100,000 people attended the sold-out concert. The concert went ahead despite the recent passing of their guest performer and friend Francis Magalona who died of acute myelogenous leukemia noon of the previous day.

The band continued to perform on sporadic worldwide tours from 2012 to 2014. Eraserheads held another reunion concert in the United States (San Francisco, Los Angeles & New Jersey) and Canada (Toronto) from October 12 to 20, 2012.

After their American Tour, the next show for the band was at the du Music Festival. Held at the Dubai Amphitheatre, UAE on April 4, 2013, the festival featured a diverse lineup of music stars including Guns N’ Roses, Train, Natalie Cole, Andrea Bocelli and other local acts. The band also featured a "fifth Eraserhead", Rommel 'Sancho' Sanchez on additional guitar duties. Rommel joined the band, too, during their 2012 North American tour. During the Dubai concert, Ely dedicated the song "Lightyears" to the OFWs.

After four months, on August 10, 2013, Eraserheads played a show in another country, Singapore. On December 27, 2013, Eraserheads and Parokya ni Edgar performed at "High Impact Asia" Meydan Racecourse, Al Meydan Road, Nad Al Sheba, Dubai, UAE.

Eraserheads performed their first major rock concert at the Eventim Apollo in London, England on April 4, 2014. This was produced by Marvin Guzman and Bernadith Marimon of Finest Workers UK Ltd in the US.

In September 2014, the band released two new songs via Esquire (Philippines edition), titled "1995" and "Sabado". This was their first release of new material in more than a decade. The magazine cover mimics the Beatles' Abbey Road cover, which was shot during the band's tour in London.

In June 2016, Eraserheads guested in the rebranding launch event, "A New Day", of the Philippine Long Distance Telephone Company, along with its subsidiary Smart Communications. The band performed 5 encore songs and 13 main setlist songs.

In a tweet posted in January 2018, Buendia said: "Some people will never understand that people who don't get along don't work together." The statement was interpreted by Philippine Daily Inquirer and some fans as a response to calls for another reunion concert in the band's home country.

A musical adaptation of Eraserheads' discography entitled Ang Huling El Bimbo ran from July 20 to September 2, 2018, at Resorts World Manila. A second run for the musical was set for March 2019.
The band's first album was set to be rereleased in its first time on vinyl format, in November 2019. In December 2020, the band released a special edition photobook that features photos taken from the Final Set concert in 2009.
The three band members, Marasigan, Zabala, and Adoro formed the band Ultracombo in 2019 and performed the songs of the Eraserheads. Adoro left the group on the following months after performing on a couple of gigs.

On August 7, 2021, Offshore Music proudly announces the release of the Sabado/1995 EP of the Eraserheads on all digital streaming platforms. The EP was written during their UK Tour back in 2014. 

On September 17, 2022, all four members of the band posted on their social media an image of the band’s logo, the reversed letter E. Two days later, it was announced that a reunion concert titled "Eraserheads Huling El Bimbo 2022" will be held on December 22, 2022, at SMDC Festival Grounds in Parañaque, Metro Manila.

At the December 2022 reunion concert, the band performed 31 songs with participation from guests such as Gary Valenciano and a holographic projection of late rapper Francis Magalona. The three-hour show, which drew a crowd of 75,000, closed with a five-minute long firework display alongside their encore performance of Huling El Bimbo. After the concert, the band teased a 2023 world tour.

Band members 
Ely Buendia – lead vocals, rhythm guitar
Buddy Zabala – bass guitar, backing vocals
Marcus Adoro – lead guitar, backing vocals
Raimund Marasigan – drums, backing vocals

Discography

Studio albums
Ultraelectromagneticpop! (1993)
Circus (1994)
Cutterpillow (1995)
Fruitcake (1996)
Sticker Happy (1997)
Natin99 (1999)
Carbon Stereoxide (2001)

EPs and demos 
Pop U! (1991)
Fruitcake (1996)
Bananatype (1997)
Please Transpose EP (2003)
Sabado/1995 (2021)

Compilations 
Aloha Milkyway (1998)
Eraserheads: The Singles (2001)
Eraserheads Anthology (2004)
Eraserheads Anthology 2 (2006)

Live albums 
Eraserheads: The Reunion Concert 08.30.08 (2008)

Collaborations 

1896 Ang Pagsilang (1996)
 "Casa Fantastica"
Francis Magalona Happy Battle (1996)
 "Unstrung Heroes" (Duet W/ Francis Magalona)
 "Sapot Feat. Planet Garapata"
Ryan Cayabyab The Silver Album (1997)
 "Tuwing Umuulan at Kapiling Ka"
Nescafe Open Up Party Live (2000)
 "Blue Jeans"
 "Pumapatak Na Naman ang Ulan"
 "Tuyo Na'ng Damdamin (Feat. APO Hiking Society)"
Bandang Pinoy Lasang Hotdog (2001, re-issued 2006)
 "Manila"
Gusto Ko ng Rock (2009)
 "Alapaap"
Superbands (Universal Records)(2005)
Silver Shiny Jeepney (All Indie Band)

Soundtracks 
Run Barbi Run (Starring Joey de Leon) (1995)
 "Run Barbi Run"

DVD 
The Reunion Concert – DVD (2009) 
The Reunion Concert – DVD (Special Edition, 2009)

Box set/package 
The Heads Set (Limited Edition) (2010) – The box set was released exclusively in Greenwich Pizza outlets, and included a free box of pizza. It contains rarities such as "Casa Fantastica", all local albums from Ultraelectromagneticpop! to Carbon Stereoxide, DVD documentary (directed by Marcus Adoro), a book and shirt designed by Cynthia Bauzon and Arnold Arre, who both collaborated with the band before. It is now out of print.

Tribute albums 
Ultraelectromagneticjam!: The Music of the Eraserheads (2005)

The Reunion: An Eraserheads Tribute Album (2012)
Ang Huling El Bimbo Musical (2018)
Pop Machine: Eraserheads Tribute Album (2020)

Publications 
Pillbox Volume 1 Number 1
Editor: Redel D. Ramos
Art Director: Cynthia F. Bauzon
Release: 1996
Published by: Pop Infinity Limited Laundry
© 1996 P.I.L.L. Corporation

Fruitcake
A separate companion storybook for the album Fruitcake (1996)
Story by: Eraserheads
Text by: Ely Buendia
Edited by: Jessica Zafra
Illustrated by: Cynthia F. Bauzon
Release: 1997
Published by: Anvil Publishing, Inc., Pasig
Printed by: Cacho Hermanos, Mandaluyong
© 1997 Eraserheads

Pillbox Volume 3
Editor: Marie Jamora
Art Director: Cynthia F. Bauzon
Release: 1998
Published by: BMG Records (Pilipinas) Inc.
© 1998 BMG Records (Pilipinas) Inc.

Magazine cover appearance 
Esquire Magazine September Issue with CD of their two new songs (2014)
Myx Magazine "Eraserheads Reunion Concert Collectors Issue" (October–November 2008)
Pulp Magazine (2000)
Cutting Edge The FREE Magazine with Sen.Angara (1997)
Sky Surf Magazine (1997)
SM Magazine (1997)
1969 life in the Age of Internet Magazine (1997)
Mirror Magazine (1996)
Miscellaneous Magazine (1996)
Woman's Today Magazine together with Cooky Chua & Meagan Aguilar(1996)
Mr. & Ms. Magazine together with Regine Tolentino(1995)

Filmography 
Run Barbi Run – starring as themselves
Wating – musical score by Eraserheads
Kuya – Marcus in a cameo role as a drug pusher
Masakit sa Dibdib – Ely Buendia in a cameo role
Tulad Ng Dati – starring Buddy as himself with Raimund Marasigan in a cameo role
San Lazaro – Ely Buendia as Manong Rex
Rakenrol – Ely Buendia in a cameo
Waiting Shed (Short Film) – Directed by Ely Buendia
The Artist Is In (Short Film) – Directed by Marcus Adoro
Manila Kingpin: The Asiong Salonga Story – Ely Buendia composed and performed the theme song La Paloma in a cameo with the boys of Hilera and veteran guitarist Nitoy Adriano, the song won as "Best Theme Song" in the 2011 Metro Manila Film Festival, the first MMFF award for Ely. The movie was also instrumental in the forming of Ely's new band, The Oktaves.
Bang Bang Alley – directed by Ely Buendia with Raquel Navarro and Yan Yuzon

Awards and nominations

References

External links 
[ Allmusic Eraserheads Biography]
Eraserheads Experience
Schizo-Archives Eraserheads

Musical groups established in 1989
Musical groups disestablished in 2002
Musical groups reestablished in 2008
Musical groups disestablished in 2014
Musical quartets
Filipino alternative rock groups
Musical groups from Quezon City
Sony Music Philippines artists